Putative RNA-binding protein 15 is a protein that in humans is encoded by the RBM15 gene.
It is an RNA-binding protein that acts as a key regulator of N6-Methyladenosine (m6A) methylation of RNAs

References

Further reading